The Confederate Martyrs Monument at the Jeffersontown City Cemetery in Jeffersontown, Kentucky, marks where four Confederate soldiers were executed "without cause or trial". Their execution was under Order 59, created by Union General Stephen G. Burbridge, known as "Butcher Burbridge" in Kentucky, which called for the execution of four Confederate prisoners for every unarmed Union citizen killed.  The total number of executions performed as a result of this order was fifty. The four soldiers commemorated on the stone were Wilson P. Lilly, Rev. Sherwood Hatley, Lindsay Duke Buckner and M. Blincoe.

History
The execution of the four Confederate soldiers was the only significant event of the American Civil War in Jeffersontown.  It was done in retaliation for the extrajudicial murder of a Union soldier on Bardstown Pike, as was common during the Civil War.  The soldiers were shot while confined, and their bodies were dumped in a ditch until their interment here.

The monument was placed on the National Register of Historic Places on July 17, 1997, the same day as the Louisville Confederate Monument and the Union Monument in Louisville.  The Confederate Soldiers Martyrs Monument in Eminence, Kentucky, that was also established to honor victims of Order 59, was also established on the same day.

Inscriptions
The monument was erected by the Albert Sidney Johnston chapter of the Daughters of the Confederacy (D.O.C).

The inscription on the front reads:
Wilson P. Lilly
Rev. Sherwood Hatley
Confederate soldiers
October 25, 1864
Robbed of the glory of death on the field
of battle by Stephen G. Burbridge who
ordered them shot without cause or trial
Erected to the memory of the four martyrs by the 
Albert Sidney Johnston chapter 
D.O.C. of Louisville, Ky. June 11, 1904
Martyrs

On the back it reads:
Wilson P. Lilly.
Sherwood Hatley.
Lindsay Duke Buckner.
M. Blincoe.
Being dead yet speaketh.

Gallery

See also
 Louisville, Kentucky, in the American Civil War
 National Register of Historic Places listings in Jefferson County, Kentucky

References

Civil War Monuments of Kentucky MPS
Jeffersontown, Kentucky
National Register of Historic Places in Jefferson County, Kentucky
Martyrs' monuments and memorials
United Daughters of the Confederacy monuments and memorials in Kentucky
1904 sculptures
1904 establishments in Kentucky